The Institute of Social Sciences, Agra (ISS), is an institute of Dr. B. R. Ambedkar University (formerly Agra  University), Agra, India.
 
The institute is situated within the heart of the city at University campus. The Institute of Social Sciences came into existence in 1955 and was headed by Prof. Desh Raj, Prof.B.P.Adhikari, Prof. D.D.Joshi (Later, Pro-Vice Chancellor, IGNOU, New Delhi) and Prof. V.K.Sethi. It has been approved by  the Ministry of Human Resources Development, Government of India, the U.P. Government. Prof Diwakar Khare is the Director.

The institute has three departments:
 Department of Statistics
 Department of Social Work
 Department of Sociology

External links 
 Indian Statistical Institute, Kolkata 
 Indian Agricultural Statistics Research Institute, New Delhi 

Universities and colleges in Agra
Educational institutions established in 1955
1955 establishments in Uttar Pradesh